Ilie Codreanu (born 22 October 1948) is a Romanian former sport shooter who competed in the 1972 Summer Olympics.

References

1948 births
Living people
Romanian male sport shooters
ISSF rifle shooters
Olympic shooters of Romania
Shooters at the 1972 Summer Olympics
Sportspeople from Bucharest
20th-century Romanian people